Stenoloba albistriata is a moth of the family Noctuidae first described by László Aladár Ronkay in 2011. It is found in northern Vietnam.

References

Moths described in 2001
Bryophilinae